Harold Jerome Hart (born July 13, 1952) is a former American football running back who played four seasons in the National Football League (NFL) with the Oakland Raiders and New York Giants. He was drafted by the Raiders in the eleventh round of the 1974 NFL Draft. He played college football at Texas Southern University and attended New Stanton Senior High School in Jacksonville, Florida. Hart was also a member of the Tampa Bay Buccaneers.

Early years
Hart played high school football for the New Stanton Senior High School Blue Devils. He played his first two years at quarterback before converting to running back. He rushed for 1,900 yards and 13 touchdowns his senior year in 1969. He also earned first-team All-State honors and played in the North-South All-Star game.

College career
Hart was a four-year start for the Texas Southern Tigers, rushing for over 2,000 yards.

Professional career

Oakland Raiders
Hart was selected by the Oakland Raiders with the 279th pick in the 1974 NFL Draft. In 1975, he returned a 102-yard kick off for a touchdown in Week 1 of Monday Night Football against the Miami Dolphins

Tampa Bay Buccaneers
Hart was chosen by the Tampa Bay Buccaneers in the 1976 NFL expansion draft. He missed the 1976 season due to injury and was released before the start of the 1977 season.

New York Giants
Hart played in one game for the New York Giants in 1977.

Oakland Raiders
Hart played in seven games for the Oakland Raiders in 1978.

References

External links
Just Sports Stats

Living people
1952 births
Players of American football from Florida
American football running backs
African-American players of American football
Texas Southern Tigers football players
Oakland Raiders players
New York Giants players
People from Lake City, Florida
21st-century African-American people
20th-century African-American sportspeople